Dieulafoy is a surname of French origin. The name may refer to:
Michel Dieulafoy (1762–1823), French playwright
Jane Dieulafoy (1851–1916), French archeologist, explorer, novelist and journalist
Marcel-Auguste Dieulafoy (1844-1920), French archaeologist
Paul Georges Dieulafoy (1839–1911), French physician and surgeon

Dieulafoy may also refer to:
Dieulafoy's lesion, a rare cause of gastric bleeding, first described by Paul Georges Dieulafoy

French-language surnames